"Just Play Music!" is a song by English band Big Audio Dynamite, released in May 1988 as the first single from their third studio album, Tighten Up, Vol. 88 (1988). The edit of "Just Play Music!" omits Don Letts' rapping from the outro and some of the samples.

In the US, it was the second song to top Billboard's then-new Modern Rock songs chart.

A heavily edited version of the single's B-side, "Much Worse", is used as the introduction of WBAI's talk radio programme "Off the Hook".

Track listing
7 Inch Single (CBS BAAD 4)
 "Just Play Music!" – 3:55
 "Much Worse" – 2:45

12 Inch Single (1) (CBS BAAD T4)
 "Just Play Music! (Extended Mix)" – 8:08
 "Much Worse (Extended Mix)" – 6:45

12 Inch Single (2) (CBS BAAD QT4)
 "Just Play Music! (Extended Remix)" – 5:51
 "Much Worse (Extended Mix)" – 5:23

CD Single (CBS CD BAAD 4)
 "Just Play Music! (Extended Mix)" – 8:08
 "Much Worse (Extended Mix)" – 6:45
 "The Bottom Line" – 4:38

Chart positions

See also 
List of Billboard number-one alternative singles of the 1980s

References

External links

1988 songs
1988 singles
Big Audio Dynamite songs
Songs written by Mick Jones (The Clash)
Song recordings produced by Mick Jones (The Clash)
CBS Records singles
Songs written by Don Letts